Anette Sofie Olsen (born 24 September 1956) is a Norwegian businesswoman.

She holds siv.øk. and Master of Business Administration degrees. She is the sole proprietor of the shipping conglomerate Fred. Olsen & Co. and through this the controlling owner and chief executive officer of the public listed companies Bonheur and Ganger Rolf. She is also chairperson of the board of several other Fred. Olsen companies, including Norges Handels og Sjøfartstidende.

Anette Olsen is daughter of Fred. Olsen who is chairman of Bonheur and Ganger Rolf. Anette Olsen became partner of Fred. Olsen & Co. in 1993, which she has inherited from her father.

References

1956 births
Living people
Norwegian businesspeople in shipping
Fred. Olsen & Co.
20th-century Norwegian businesswomen
20th-century Norwegian businesspeople
21st-century Norwegian businesswomen
21st-century Norwegian businesspeople